Ivan Delić (born 29 September 1998) is a Croatian professional footballer who plays for Italian  club Cosenza on loan from Šibenik as a forward.

Club career
Born in Split, Delić graduated from the youth academy of Hajduk Split and was promoted to the reserves ahead of the 2017–18 season. On 29 October 2017, he made his first team debut, coming on as a substitute for Ivan Pešić in a 0–0 draw against Slaven Belupo.

On 17 April 2018, Delić signed his first professional contract, penning a deal until 2021.

On 31 January 2023, Delić joined Cosenza in the Italian second-tier Serie B on loan, with an option to buy.

International career
On 10 October 2015, Delić was called to the under-17 team for the Under-17 World Cup.

Career statistics

References

External links

Ivan Delić at Hajduk Split's website

1998 births
Living people
Footballers from Split, Croatia
Association football forwards
Croatian footballers
Croatia youth international footballers
HNK Hajduk Split II players
HNK Hajduk Split players
NK Istra 1961 players
NK Varaždin (2012) players
NK Slaven Belupo players
HNK Šibenik players
Cosenza Calcio players
Croatian Football League players
First Football League (Croatia) players
Croatian expatriate footballers
Expatriate footballers in Italy
Croatian expatriate sportspeople in Italy